Vrbětice  is a village and administrative part of Vlachovice in Zlín District in the Zlín Region of the Czech Republic. It is located in the valley of the river Vlára.

History
The first written mention of Vrbětice dates back to 1318. Although Vrbětice is in the immediate vicinity of Vlachovice, the village has always belonged to the Hošťálková rule and was at no time subject to Vlachovice. Serf conditions in Vrbětice were very mild. With the exception of forest work, its residents were exempt from forced labour. In the 1620 land register, a hereditary bailiff is documented for the first time in Vrbětice.

In 1850, after the abolition of patrimonial, Vrbětice formed a municipality in the district administration Uherský Brod and the judicial district Valašské Klobouky. The first school was built here in 1882.

In 2014, a series of explosions occurred in a military warehouse in Vrbětice. Presumably, the explosion was caused by the Russian GRU agents.

Demographics
In 1880 the population of the village was 410 people. Since then, the population has mostly stagnated. As of 2011, 341 people lived in the village.

Sights
 The timbered wooden bell tower from the 19th century is the main sight. It has been protected as a cultural monument since 3 May 1958. It is located in the centre of the village and has been renovated twice — in 1900 and 1965.
 Mikulec' Cross by the road to Vlachovice.
 A memorial to the victims of World War I was built in the park next to the school in 1928 and a memorial to the victims of World War II was added to it in 1945.

References

Villages in Zlín District